The 1798 New Hampshire gubernatorial election took place on March 13, 1798. Incumbent Federalist Governor John Taylor Gilman won re-election to a fifth term, easily defeating various minor candidates.

Results

References

Notes 

Gubernatorial
New Hampshire
1798